Piploda State was an estate in India at the time of the British Raj. It belonged to the Malwa Agency, part of the Central India Agency. The state had an area of 155 km2.

History
The Thakurs of Piploda were Dodiya Rajputs from the Kathiawar region, one of the ancestors called Kaluji migrated to Malwa and captured the fort of Sabalgarh in 1285. The Sixth son of Kaluji who was called Shardul Singh extended his domains and founded the village of Piploda. During the rise of the Marathas in Malwa, Piploda was reduced to a great extent and the thakur was forced to become a vassal of Amir Khan Pindari. Piploda later benefited from the treaty of Mandsore, in which Jaora was confirmed as a princely state by the British. The Thakur of Piploda was allowed to rule in his estate on the condition that he pays Rs.28,000 as tribute to the Jaora nawab. During the great Indian mutiny, the Thakur of Piploda helped the British authorities by sending his army to Mandsaur. The estate had 28 villages, a population of 11,441 (1901) and a revenue of Rs.95,000 (1901). The last ruler acceded to the Government of India on 15 June 1948, and Piploda became part of Ratlam District of Madhya Bharat state.

Thakurs  
.... - ....                Sadal Singh
1820 - 18..                Prithvi Singh
18.. - 18..                Umed Sigh
18.. - 12 Nov 1863         Onkar Singh                        (d. 1863)
30 Nov 1863 – 26 Oct 1888  Dulai Singh                        (b. 1852 - d. 1888)
 8 Nov 1888 -  4 Nov 1919  Kesri Singh                        (b. 1872 - d. 1919)
 5 Nov 1919 - 1936         Mangal Singh                       (b. 1893 - d. 1936)
1936 - 15 Jun 1948         Raghuraj Singh

See also
List of Rajput dynasties and states
Malwa Agency

References

External links

 Piploda princely state
Imperial Gazetteer of India, v. 20, p. 148.

States and territories established in 1547
Princely states of Madhya Pradesh
States and territories disestablished in 1948
1948 disestablishments in India
1547 establishments in India